The Comac ARJ21 Xiangfeng is a 78–90 seat regional jet manufactured by the Chinese state-owned aerospace company Comac.

Development of the ARJ21 (Advanced Regional Jet) began in March 2002, the first prototype was rolled out on 21 December 2007, and made its maiden flight on 28 November 2008 from Shanghai. It received its CAAC Type Certification on 30 December 2014 and was introduced on 28 June 2016 by Chengdu Airlines.

Resembling the McDonnell Douglas MD-80/MD-90 produced under licence in China, it features a 25° swept, supercritical wing designed by Antonov and twin rear-mounted General Electric CF34 engines. 100 airframes had been delivered by the end of 2022.

Development

The development of the ARJ21 (Advanced Regional Jet) is a key project in the "10th Five-Year Plan" of China. It began in March 2002 and was led by the state-owned ACAC consortium. The maiden flight of the ARJ21 was initially planned to take place in 2005 with commercial service beginning 18 months later. The programme became eight years behind schedule.
The design work was delayed and the final trial production stage did not begin until June 2006.

The first prototype (serial number 101) rolled out on 21 December 2007, with a maiden flight on 28 November 2008 at Shanghai's Dachang Airfield. The aircraft completed a long-distance test flight on 15 July 2009, flying from Shanghai to Xi'an in 2 hours 19 minutes, over a distance of 1,300 km. The second ARJ21 (serial number 102) completed the same test flight route on 24 August 2009. The third aircraft (serial number 103) similarly completed its first test flight on 12 September 2009. The fourth aircraft (CN 104) flew by November 2010. By August 2011, static, flutter and crosswind flight tests had been completed.

The ARJ21 is a small jet aircraft that looks similar to the MD-80, which was licensed to be built in China. COMAC claims that it Variations on an original design, part of which was created by supercomputers in China. The ACAC consortium was reorganized in 2009 and became a part of COMAC.

Key flight tests and CAAC certification
AC104 returned to China on April 28, 2014, after completing natural-icing tests in North America. This was the first time a turbofan-powered regional jet independently developed by China had flown abroad to carry out flight tests in special weather conditions. At the same time, other flight-test aircraft covered more than 30,000 km across Asia, America, Europe, and the Pacific and Atlantic oceans. Natural-icing tests are required for airworthiness certification, and conducting these tests outside China showed it was feasible to do certification tests for civil aircraft in other countries.

The first production aircraft flew on 18 June 2014. and AC104 completed an airspeed calibration flight on October 30. Route-proving started on October 29, 2014, and AC105 made 83 flights between ten airports in Chengdu, Guiyang, Guilin, Haikou, Fuzhou, Zhoushan, Tianjin, Shijiazhuang, Yinchuan and Xianyang. The cumulative flight time was 173 hours and 55 minutes. By November 2014, AC104 had completed 711 flights in 1,442 hours and 23 minutes. Certification tests included stall, high-speed, noise and simulated and natural icing. AC105 returned to Yanliang airport on December 16, 2014, from Xi'an Xianyang International Airport after the last function and reliability flight. This completed the testing for the ARJ21-700 airworthiness certificate.

The ARJ21-700 received its Type Certification under Chapter 25 of the Chinese civil aviation regulations from the Civil Aviation Administration of China (CAAC), on December 30, 2014. The certification program for the CAAC required 5,000 hours.
An ARJ21-700 completed a final demonstration flight on 12 September 2015 before being delivered to a customer.

Introduction

On 29 November 2015, COMAC delivered the first ARJ21-700 to Chengdu Airlines.  The first commercial flight took off from Chengdu Shuangliu Airport on June 28, 2016, landing in Shanghai two hours later. one day after its commercial flight was approved by the CAAC. During the summer schedule period of 2016, i.e. until October 29, 2016, the ARJ21-700 was scheduled to operate three weekly rotations between Chengdu and Shanghai Hongqiao. 85 flight segments were operated by ARJ21 (81 by B-3321, four by B-3322).

Further developments 

In June 2018 an ARJ21-700+ was proposed for 2021 with weight and drag reductions. Subsequently, a -900 stretch version was designed to accommodate 115 all-economy seats, similar to the Bombardier CRJ900, Embraer E175-E2 or Mitsubishi MRJ90.
Structurally conservative and designed for hot and high operations, the ARJ21's  empty weight is higher than initially targeted in 2002, and also higher than competing aircraft. In 2018 an executive version was in final assembly and a cargo variant was proposed. 

The ARJ21 Passenger to Freighter (P2F) conversion program was setup in May 2020 with the type certification and testing  program completed in December 2022 and the type was certified by the CAAC on 1 January, 2023.

Production
In early July 2017, the CAAC certified the ARJ21 for mass production.  On 6 March 2020, the first ARJ21 assembled at the second production line in Pudong, took its first production test flight. The second production line, with a production capacity of up to 30 jets a year, is located at the same facility that assembles the C919.

Design
Several Western sources claim the ARJ21 closely resembles either the McDonnell Douglas MD-80 or the MD-90 which were produced under licence in China.  Comac states that the ARJ21 is a completely indigenous design.  The ARJ21's development did depend heavily on foreign suppliers, including engines and avionics from the United States. The ARJ21 has a new supercritical wing designed by Ukraine's Antonov Design Bureau with a sweepback of 25 degrees and winglets. Some of China's supercomputers have been used to design parts for ARJ21.

Manufacturers
Members of the ACAC consortium, which was formed to develop the aircraft, will manufacture major components of the aircraft:
 Chengdu Aircraft Industry Group: construction of the nose
 Xi'an Aircraft Company: construction of the wings and fuselage; wing designed by Antonov State Company in Ukraine.
 Shenyang Aircraft Corporation: construction of the empennage
 Shanghai Aircraft Company: final assembly
 General Electric: CF-34 turbofan
 Rockwell Collins: Avionics
 Various domestic and international suppliers of component's suppliers.

Variants
ARJ21-700
Baseline model which has a capacity of 70 to 95 passengers.
ARJ21-900
Stretched fuselage model based on the ARJ21-700, which will have a capacity of 95 to 105 passengers.
ARJ21F
Planned dedicated freighter version of the ARJ21-700. It will have a capacity of five LD7 containers or  PIP pallets, with a maximum payload of 10,150 kg.

ARJ21P2F 
The ARJ21P2F is designed with a maximum payload of 10,150kg and is compatible with PMC, PAG and AKE cargo containers. The first aircraft began conversion operations on 22 December, 2022 at GAMECO in Guangzhou, China. The first batch of conversions involves 2 ARJ21-700 aircraft originally operated by Chengdu Airlines and was returned to COMAC in 2021.
ARJ21B
Planned business jet version of the ARJ21-700. A typical configuration would cater for 20 passengers.

Operators

As of October 2018, there were six aircraft in commercial service with an average monthly utilization rate of around 30 hours.

By the end of 2021, 66 aircraft had been delivered to customers. And by the end of 2022, 100 aircraft have been delivered.

Orders and deliveries
As of 31 August 2018, Comac had 221 outstanding orders, after 23 deliveries to launch operator Chengdu Airlines who put it in service on 28 June 2016.

Executing Orders

The following table is current as of 1 January 2023. Note that the numbers listed in the table have been obtained by cross-referencing the two web-based sources cited in the footnotes. Also note that the numbers listed are for the year of initial deliveries of airframes to (non-COMAC) commercial aerial services operators and do not necessarily reflect the number of airframes currently operated by each such operator; as a result, the total number delivered may exceed the total number of airframes cited in the original contracts. 
Reported Orders

An Indonesian airline will fly with its entire fleet consisting of 60 ARJ21 aircraft, although as of now that airline is not specified.

Specifications

 Notes: Data are provided for reference only. STD = Standard Range, ER = Extended Range
 Sources: ARJ21 Series, ICAS

See also

References

External links

 ACAC Manufacturer of ARJ21
 
 
 

Comac aircraft
2000s Chinese airliners
Twinjets
T-tail aircraft
Aircraft first flown in 2008